Pistiros Lake is the slightly bent southwards rectangular lake, 320 m long in west-east direction and 90 m wide on President Beaches, Byers Peninsula on Livingston Island in the South Shetland Islands, Antarctica. It has a surface area of 2.42 ha, and is separated from the waters of New Plymouth by a 20 to 35 m wide strip of land. The area was visited by early 19th century sealers.

The feature is named after the ancient emporium of Pistiros in Southern Bulgaria.

Location
Detailed Spanish mapping in 1992, and Bulgarian mapping in 2009 and 2017.

Maps
 Península Byers, Isla Livingston. Mapa topográfico a escala 1:25000. Madrid: Servicio Geográfico del Ejército, 1992
 L. Ivanov. Antarctica: Livingston Island and Greenwich, Robert, Snow and Smith Islands. Scale 1:120000 topographic map. Troyan: Manfred Wörner Foundation, 2010.  (First edition 2009. )
 L. Ivanov. Antarctica: Livingston Island and Smith Island. Scale 1:100000 topographic map. Manfred Wörner Foundation, 2017. 
 Antarctic Digital Database (ADD). Scale 1:250000 topographic map of Antarctica. Scientific Committee on Antarctic Research (SCAR). Since 1993, regularly upgraded and updated

See also
 Antarctic lakes
 Livingston Island

Notes

References
 Pistiros Lake. SCAR Composite Gazetteer of Antarctica
 Bulgarian Antarctic Gazetteer. Antarctic Place-names Commission. (details in Bulgarian, basic data in English)
 Management Plan for Antarctic Specially Protected Area No. 126 Byers Peninsula. Measure 4 (2016), ATCM XXXIX Final Report. Santiago, 2016

External links
 Pistiros Lake. Adjusted Copernix satellite image

Bodies of water of Livingston Island
Lakes of the South Shetland Islands
Bulgaria and the Antarctic